Heteropsyche poecilochroma is a moth in the family Epipyropidae. It is found in Australia.

The wingspan is about 10 mm. The forewings are greyish fuscous strigulated with dark and brownish fuscous. The hindwings are dark fuscous and somewhat brownish tinged.

The larvae feed on planthoppers of the superfamily Fulgoroidea.

References

Moths described in 1905
Epipyropidae